Midongy du sud National Park (also known as Midongy-Befotaka) is a national park in the region of Atsimo-Atsinanana, in south-east Madagascar. The  park has the second largest rainforest on the island and is rich in endemic animals and plants, especially medicinal plants.

History
Midongy first received protection in 1953 and became a national park in 1997.

Geography
The park is also an Important Bird Area overlapping with the national park and is divided into two main parts; the Befotaka Forest  and the Soarano Forest . It is served by unpaved roads which may be impassable during the wet season of December to June. Many streams drain the mountains to feed marshes in the lowlands. Due to the rugged topography and the humid climate, Madagascar's second largest rain forest is within the park.

Ethnic groups living here are the Antaisaka people and the Bara people.

Flora and fauna
Midongy du sud is rich in endemic plants, especially medical plants. 348 species live in the park of which 250 are only known to Madagascar.
They include Mystroxylon aethiopicum, a member of the Celastraceae which is said to help with injuries, and the sap of Medinilla sp, is used for coughs. There are fourteen endangered plants which are listed in the International Union for Conservation of Nature (IUCN) red list for endangered species, and the orchids, Aeranthes caudata and Bulbophyllum vestitum are listed by the Convention on International Trade in Endangered Species of Wild Fauna and Flora (CITES) on Appendix II. The main tree species within the forest are Brachylaena, Calophyllum,  Cryptocarya, Dalbergia, Diospyros, Elaeocarpus, Eugenia, Ocotea, Ravensara, Symphonia Tambourissa and Uapaca species. Marsh vegetation includes the screw-pine (Pandanus) and species of sedge (Carex).

4 species of lemurs are found in the park, including the most endangered species: the Greater bamboo lemur (Prolemur sinus). The park hosts furthermore 348 species of birds, 56 species of amphibians, 53 species of reptiles and 6 Carnivores and 4 bats.

See also
 List of national parks of Madagascar

References

External links
 Official website

Picture gallery

National parks of Madagascar
Atsimo-Atsinanana
Protected areas established in 1997
IUCN Category VI
Important Bird Areas of Madagascar
Madagascar subhumid forests